Ruslan Borysovych Khomchak (born 5 June 1967) is a Ukrainian Colonel-general who serves as the First Deputy Secretary of the National Security and Defense Council of Ukraine and former Commander-in-Chief of the Armed Forces of Ukraine, until 28 March 2020 also holding the post of Chief of the General Staff.

Previously from 21 May 2019, he combined this post of Commander-in-Chief of the Armed Forces of Ukraine with the post of Chief of the General Staff. On 28 March 2020, a decree by President Volodymyr Zelensky divided the posts of Commander in Chief and Chief of General Staff. On this day Zelensky dismissed Khomchak from the post of Chief of General Staff and appointed him Chief Commander of Armed Forces while simultaneously he appointed Serhiy Korniychuk Chief of the General Staff.

On July 27, 2021, Ruslan Khomchak was dismissed from the position of Commander-in-Chief of the Armed Forces of Ukraine and appointed as the First Deputy Secretary of the National Security and Defense Council of Ukraine.

Biography
Khomchak was born in Lviv on 5 June 1967. He graduated from the Moscow Higher Military Command School in 1988. Khomchak then served in East Germany and in the Belarusian SSR between 1988 and 1992.

Following Ukrainian independence in 1991 Khomchak became a military commander of the Armed Forces of Ukraine. From 1993 to 2000 Khomchak served in the 24th Mechanized Brigade. He was promoted to the rank of lieutenant-general in 2013. Khomchak participated in some of the most consequential battles during the war in Donbas. He was sectoral commander of Ukrainian forces during the Battle of Ilovaisk, in which Ukrainian units were surrounded and decisively defeated by separatists and their Russian backers. Reflecting on the battle several years later, Khomchak's predecessor as Commander-in-Chief, Viktor Muzhenko, suggested that the incompetence of Ukrainian commanders, and the large number of Russian troops fighting for the separatists, were largely to blame for the disastrous outcome.

On 21 May 2019, President of Ukraine Volodymyr Zelensky appointed Ruslan Khomchak Chief of the General Staff and Commander-in-Chief of the Armed Forces of Ukraine. On 28 March 2020 a decree by President Zelensky divided the posts of Commander in Chief and Chief of General Staff. On this day Zelensky dismissed Khomchak from the post of Chief of General Staff and appointed him Chief Commander of Armed Forces while simultaneously he appointed Serhiy Korniychuk Chief of the General Staff.

On 10 September 2020, Khomchak tested positive for COVID-19.

Family 
Khomchak is married to Anna Kovalenko. Kovalenko is a civic activist, journalist, active Euromaidan participant, former adviser to the three Ministers of Defense of Ukraine and a Minister of Information Policy of Ukraine. She was Head of the Chernihiv Regional State Administration from 13 October 2020 until 4 August 2021.

In January 2021 Kovalenko gave birth to the couple's daughter Maria.

References

External links

1967 births
Living people
Military personnel from Lviv
National Security and Defense Council of Ukraine
Ivan Chernyakhovsky National Defense University of Ukraine alumni
Lieutenant generals of Ukraine
Chiefs of the General Staff (Ukraine)
Ukrainian military personnel of the war in Donbas
Recipients of the Order of Merit (Ukraine), 3rd class
Ukrainian military personnel of the 2022 Russian invasion of Ukraine